is a Japanese video game developer founded in 1995 as , based in Taitō, Tokyo, Japan. Originally a dōjin circle, French Bread became well known for their work in 2D fighting games, particularly the Melty Blood series. In recent years, they worked on other licensed-based fighting games, such as Dengeki Bunko Fighting Climax and the company’s original game, Under Night In-Birth. Most of its developed video games are commonly released for Microsoft Windows, Sega arcade systems, and PlayStation consoles.

History

The studio was named after a friend of Nobuya Narita, with whom he often played video games with the latter after school. They initially developed desk accessories for Windows. He subsequently decided to develop his own project for Windows. It was initially conceived as an original work, but creating unique character designs and graphics proved difficult. Narita was later introduced to the visual novel To Heart and decided to develop his game as a derivative work. Characters for his project were sourced from To Heart, while the system mechanics were based on Asuka 120%, a game that served as an influence for Narita and his team. The Queen of Heart '98 was released on December 30, 1998 to positive critical reception from dojin gamers. The Queen of Heart series sold about 100,000 copies, and Watanabe Seisakujo became one of the most popular dōjin game developers. This surfaced significant copyright concern. Some hobbyists also uploaded M.U.G.E.N characters with data extracted from the game. Watanabe Seisakujo and Leaf received many inquiries about permission, although they had no relation to uploaders. Narita didn't hope a derivative work disturbed its original work and developer. The circle name came from the dōjin circle to which Narita belonged to before Watanabe Seisakujo.

Since Melty Blood, French-Bread heavily uses a sprite drawing software known as EDGE2 to create character sprites for their future games.

Narita is also a close friend of Hiiragiboshi Takumi, the author of the Absolute Duo light novel series. They met over 15 years ago while both were still amateurs making doujins. Narita and the game developer's sprite artist Seichi Yoshihara has helped in designing battle suits for said novel series.

The founder of freelance video game developer group Subtle Style and the creator of Akatsuki EN-Eins series, Subtle becomes reoccurring freelance sprite artist for later modern French-Bread games since Under Night In-Birth and exchange to allow French Bread to include the titular Akatsuki Blitzkampf protagonist guest appearing in French Bread's said first original game series.

Games developed

As Watanabe Seisakujo

As Soft Circle French-Bread

Arcade Games

Console & Computer Games

References

External links 
  (Old)
  (New, under the name "Unknown Co., Ltd.")

Video game companies of Japan
Video game development companies
Doujin soft developers
Video game companies established in 1995
Japanese companies established in 1995